Marumba diehli is a species of moth of the family Sphingidae. It is known from Sumatra and Java.

References

Marumba
Moths described in 1975